Sir Lloyd George Geering  (born 26 February 1918) is a New Zealand theologian who faced charges of heresy in 1967 for teaching that the Bible's record of Jesus' death and resurrection is not true. He considers Christian and Muslim fundamentalism to be "social evils". Geering is emeritus professor of religious studies at Victoria University of Wellington. In 2007, he was appointed a Member of the Order of New Zealand, New Zealand's highest civilian honour, limited to 20 living people. Geering turned 100 in February 2018.

Early life and family
Geering was born in Rangiora on 26 February 1918, the son of Alice (née Johnston) and George Frederick Thomas Geering. The family spent four years in Australia from 1927 to 1930, where Geering was dux of Warrnambool Elementary School, before returning to Dunedin. He was educated at Otago Boys' High School between 1931 and 1935, where he was dux in his final year and vice-captain of the hockey 1st XI.

In 1936, Geering went on to study mathematics at the University of Otago, graduating Bachelor of Arts with first-class honours in 1940. While at Otago, he continued playing hockey and was a member of the university's first-grade team. He was also active in university dramatic productions, debating and the Otago Student Christian Movement, being elected president of the latter in 1939. In 1939, Geering was nominated for a Rhodes Scholarship by the University of Otago.

Geering "embraced" the Christian tradition in 1937. After completing his BA(Hons), he entered Knox College as a theological student in 1940, and was exempted from military service in World War II. He later said: I was a pacifist anyway by this stage. I took my Christian convictions so seriously that I couldn’t reconcile them with being a soldier.

On 22 May 1943, Geering married Nancy Marie McKenzie at Trinity Presbyterian Church, Timaru. The couple had two children before Nancy Geering died from tuberculosis in Dunedin on 4 October 1949. On 20 November 1951, Geering married Elaine Morrison Parker, a speech therapist, and they went on to have one child. Elaine Geering died in 2001. Geering married Shirley Evelyn Adams in 2004. She died at the age of 95 in 2021.

Career
Geering was ordained as a minister of the Presbyterian Church of Aotearoa New Zealand (PCANZ) in 1943 and practised as a minister in Kurow; Opoho, Dunedin (1945-1950); and St James, Wellington (1950-1956) before turning to theological teaching. He was the honorary associate minister of St John's Church in Wellington from 1971 to 1983. He was named honorary assistant at St Andrew's in Wellington in 1989. Geering remains on the register (Fasti) of New Zealand Presbyterian ministers.

Geering has held the positions of professor of Old Testament studies at Presbyterian Church Hall, Brisbane, Queensland, Australia (1956-1960), professor of Old Testament studies at Theological Hall, Dunedin (1960-1963), and principal of Theological Hall, Dunedin (1963-1971). In 1971, Geering became the foundation professor of religious studies at Victoria University of Wellington and held this position until his retirement in 1984 when he was appointed professor emeritus. In 1983, he became a lecturer at the St Andrew's Trust for the Study of Religion and Society.

Geering is a member of the Jesus Seminar and a participant in the Living the Questions programme, an alternative to the evangelical Alpha course, which he calls “dangerous indoctrination” growing among mainstream churches. He is also a member of the Sea of Faith Network (New Zealand), and St Andrew's On The Terrace, as well as principal lecturer at St Andrew's Trust for the Study of Religion and Society.

Heresy charges
In 1967, Geering gained a high-profile when he was charged with "doctrinal error" and "disturbing the peace and unity of the (Presbyterian) church". The case was brought before the 1967 General Assembly of the PCANZ, and dismissed without being much discussed. The charges were brought by a group of conservative laymen and a conservative minister. During his church trial, he claimed that the remains of Jesus lay somewhere in Palestine and that the resurrection had been wrongfully interpreted by churches as a resuscitation of the body of Jesus.  He also rejects the belief held by all monotheistic faiths that God is a supernatural being who created and continues to look over the world.

Later life
Geering's second wife, Elaine, died in Cromwell on 19 August 2001. In 2004, Geering married Shirley Evelyn White (née Adams).

On 26 February 2018, Geering celebrated his 100th birthday, emulating his father who also reached 100 years of age.

Shirley, Lady Geering, died in Petone on 1 October 2021.

In 2021, Geering joined the group Intergenerational Climate Ambassadors, established in 2020 by scientist Jim Salinger and Sophie Handford, a Kapiti Coast district councillor. At the time, Geering said:
"Fundamentalist Christianity would regard things to be in the hands of a God who controls. That idea of God has just vanished really. We now know that we are in the hands of natural forces in the world, and because of what humans have done to the earth, they have produced a situation where the temperature's going up all the time – and it will reach a limit which we can't survive."

Honours and awards
In 1976, Geering was conferred an honorary Doctor of Divinity degree by the University of Otago.

In the 1988 New Year Honours, Geering was appointed a Commander of the Order of the British Empire, and in the 2001 New Year Honours he was made a Principal Companion of the New Zealand Order of Merit, for services to religious studies. In the 2007 New Year Honours, he was appointed a Member of the Order of New Zealand. In 2009, he accepted redesignation as a Knight Grand Companion of the New Zealand Order of Merit, following the restoration of titular honours by the New Zealand government.

Geering is a patron of the Coalition for Open Government.

Selected publications
 Portholes to the Past: Reflections on the early 20th century (2016). Wellington, Aotearoa New Zealand: Steele Roberts, 
 On Me Bike: Cycling round New Zealand 80 years ago (2015). Wellington, Aotearoa New Zealand: Steele Roberts, 
 Reimagining God: The Faith Journey of a Modern Heretic (2014). Salem, OR: Polebridge Press, 
 From the Big Bang to God: Our Awe-Inspiring Journey of Evolution (2013). Aotearoa, NZ: Steele Roberts, Salem, OR: Polebridge Press, . Ebook  
 Such Is Life!: A Close Encounter With Ecclesiastes (2010). Aotearoa, NZ: Steele Roberts, 
 Coming Back to Earth: From gods to God to Gaia (2009). Salem, OR: Polebridge Press, 
 In Praise of the Secular (2007). St Andrews, 
 Is Christianity Going Anywhere? (2004). St Andrews, 
 Wrestling with God: The Story of My Life (2006). 
 The Greening of Christianity (2005) 
 Christianity without God (2002). Salem, OR: Polebridge Press, 
 Christian Faith at the Crossroads (revised 2001). Salem, OR: Polebridge Press,  
 The World to Come: From Christian Past to Global Future (1999). Salem, OR: Polebridge Press, 
 Tomorrow's God: How We Create our Worlds (1996). Salem, OR: Polebridge Press reprint 2000, 
 In the World Today (1988)
 The World of Relation: An Introduction to Martin Buber's I and Thou (1983)
 Faith's New Age: A Perspective on Contemporary Religious Change (1980)
 Resurrection – A Symbol of Hope (1971)
 God in the New World (1968)

Notes

References
 
 
 
 
 
 
 
 
 Veitch, James (1990) Faith in an age of turmoil: essays in honour of Lloyd Geering, Oriental University Press,

External links

 Geering’s theological journey
 .
 Geering, Lloyd New Zealand Book Council. Retrieved 26 December 2010.
 Lloyd Geering is a member of the St Andrew's Trust for the study of Religion and Society. Lloyd Geering is a founding member of the St Andrew's Trust for the Study of Religion and Society (SATRS) Trust Board.
 St Andrew's on The Terrace , Presbyterian Church Lloyd Geering is Theologian-in-residence at St Andrew's on The Terrace

1918 births
Living people
New Zealand Commanders of the Order of the British Empire
Members of the Order of New Zealand
New Zealand theologians
Knights Grand Companion of the New Zealand Order of Merit
Religious naturalists
University of Otago alumni
Academic staff of the Victoria University of Wellington
People from Rangiora
Members of the Jesus Seminar
New Zealand centenarians
Men centenarians